Floating World may refer to:

Society
 Ukiyo ("floating, fleeting, or transient world"), the urban lifestyle, especially the pleasure-seeking aspects, of Edo-period Japan (1600–1867)

Music

Albums
 Floating World (Anathallo album), 2006
 Floating World (Jade Warrior album), 1974

Songs
 "The Floating World", a 1976 song by English rock band Soft Machine.
 "The Floating World", a 2002 instrumental by Scottish rock band Simple Minds, written by Vince Clarke, which closes their studio album Cry.

Tours
 The Floating World Tour, a 2002 music tour by Scottish rock band Simple Minds named after their instrumental "The Floating World".